Gary Kowalski may refer to:
 Gary Kowalski (politician) (born 1952), politician in Manitoba, Canada
 Gary Kowalski (American football) (born 1960), American football player
 Gary A. Kowalski (born 1953), American author